The Morris County Park Commission (MCPC) is a board of commissioners that manages parks, facilities, and historic sites in Morris County, New Jersey. 

It is the largest county park system in New Jersey. Russel Myers was its first Secretary-Director and Director, serving the system from 1955 until 1983.

As of May 2022, it operates 38 facilities include outdoor parks, trails, a marina, an ice skating arena, a horse stable, a historical farm, and an operating mill.

History 

Morris County was not first of its kind nor unique. It likely followed in the footsteps of other local park commissions. For example, New York City's Central Park Commission was founded in 1856; Hudson County Park Commission was created in 1892; and the Essex County Park Commission was created in 1895.

Circa 1955, the Morris County Planning board recommended the creation of a Park Commission to the Morris County Board of Chosen Freeholders. The goal of the commission was to provide attractive recreation areas, as well as aid traffic problems and protect limited water resources. Passage of a voter referendum in 1956 formally established a Morris County Park Commission, and this was reported upon in American City. Its first leader was Secretary-Director Russel W. Myers, a landscape architect. That year, the Garden Club of America announced an alliance with the Morris County Park Commission's mission of "acquiring land, preserving natural areas, [and] protecting watersheds and streams from pollution."

In March of 1958, the 350-acre Lewis Morris County Park in Morristown was the first park to be dedicated by the MCPC. As of 2021, it has expanded to 2,196 acres with 22.1 miles of trails. The park alone includes "hiking, off-road biking, and equestrian trails[,] picnic areas[,] athletic fields, a dog park, group camping areas[,] sledding, snowshoeing, and cross-country skiing" and, in the summer, the Sunrise Lake Beach Club, a water obstacle course, a flume, paddleboat riding, and fishing. The park was named for Lewis Morris, the first Governor of New Jersey (according to some sources) while it was part of Britain's Thirteen Colonies.

Since 1962, the Morris County Park Commission developed buffer areas and programs to protect the Great Swamp from urban development.

Circa 1973, Myers, a landscape architect and MCPC's Secretary-Director, had weekly tea for years with Morristown farmer Caroline Foster. In 1973, they arranged for Foster to bequeath her farm estate to the MCPC. In 1974, farmer Caroline Foster designated in her will that Fosterfields would be bequeathed to the MCPC for use as an educational farm and historic site. Upon Foster's death in 1979, the Park Commission received the farm.

In 1979, Myers announced that the commission was opposed to the proposed alignment of Interstate 287. This was due to the environmental detriment to the Sunset Valley Golf Course as well as noise and drainage issues created by the proposed road.

In 1983, the Russell M. Myers Scholarship was established, named for the first Secretary-Director and later Director of the MCPC.

In July 2020, WKXW and InsiderNJ reported that Morris County parks saw increased use since Governor Phil Murphy reopened parks during the COVID-19 pandemic.

In 2019, the Morris County Park Commission announced their intention to create a recreational trail looping around the  Boonton Reservoir, a source of clean drinking water for over 300,000 people. Circa 2021, the Morris County Park Commission received the permit. The MCPC expects to break ground in the trail's creation in 2022.

In 2021, the MCPC unanimously voted "aye" to create improvements to Lewis Morris County Park in Harding Township. The area receiving improvements is dedicated to Russel Myers, titled the Russ Myers Recreation Area. The "halfmile ADA Accessible loop trail encircling the area...will have an 8’ wide paved surface, a picnic shelter with electricity to accommodate 200 people, landscaping for screening and beautification, and additional parking to accommodate increased capacity, including ADA parking." The estimated cost is $904,730.00.

List of parks 

The below parks and historic sites are overseen by the Morris County Park Commission.

References

External links

County government agencies in New Jersey
County parks departments in the United States
1956 establishments in New Jersey
Government agencies established in 1956
Morris County, New Jersey